John Ewing (born April 18, 1961) is the treasurer of Douglas County, Nebraska, USA. He is a member of the Democratic Party. In 2012, Ewing ran for the United States House of Representatives for Nebraska's 2nd District, but lost to incumbent Lee Terry.

Education
Ewing graduated from Omaha Northwest High School, attending the same high school as his future political opponent Lee Terry. Ewing received a B.S. in criminal justice and business administration from the University of Nebraska, Omaha. In 1986, he also earned a master's degree in urban studies there.

Career
Ewing was an officer with the Omaha police department for 24 years, rising to the rank of deputy police chief. He was elected the treasurer of Douglas County in 2006, and re-elected in 2010. Ewing was the first African-American elected to a county-wide office in Nebraska. As treasurer, he successfully encouraged Nebraska to allow online renewals of driver's licenses.

Ewing is an adjunct professor at the University of Nebraska, Omaha. Ewing is also an associate minister with the Salem Baptist Church in Omaha.

Ewing ran against Republican Congressman Lee Terry in 2012. Terry won re-election, defeating Ewing 51.2% to 48.8%. Ewing is reported to be a potential future candidate for the seat.

References

External links
Project Vote Smart profile

1961 births
African-American people in Nebraska politics
County officials in Nebraska
Nebraska Democrats
Living people
Politicians from Omaha, Nebraska
University of Nebraska Omaha alumni
21st-century African-American people
20th-century African-American people